De Aston School is a mixed secondary school with academy status in Market Rasen, Lincolnshire, England. It also has a sixth form but no longer has a boarding house as of 2020, following the country's decision to leave the European Union, due to its declining popularity and dwindling funds. The school has a broad Christian ethos but accommodates those of other faiths.

Admissions
The school has 1,002 pupils. The school used to provide boarding accommodation for around 80 pupils, many of whom came from abroad. De Aston was a specialist school in mathematics and computing.

History

Grammar school

De Aston School was founded in 1863 as a small grammar school, as part of a legal settlement following a court case involving funds from the medieval charity of Thomas De Aston, a 14th-century monk. Until 1995, the school's Foundation Governors also owned the chapel at the site of the charity's Almshouses at Spital-in-the-Street, 10 miles to the west.

The school's headmaster originally had his own house on the school site. The Victorian Gothic red brick house was built in 1863 and was designated as a Grade II listed building by English Heritage in 1984. The original buildings was designed by the Louth Architect James Fowler and further additions were added in 1904-6 by the Lincoln architect Herbert Dunn. As a grammar school it was administered by the Lindsey Education Committee, based in Lincoln, and became co-educational in 1971.

Comprehensive
It became a comprehensive in 1974 (when Lincoln became comprehensive), amalgamating with Market Rasen Secondary Modern School on Kilnwell Road. At the same time, new buildings were opened.

Academy
The school converted to academy status in March 2011.

Headteachers

 Simon Porter 2017-current day (as of 2022 13 sept)

Media
In March 2001, at the Secondary Heads Association's conference in Newport, Ellenor Beighton, head teacher, spoke out against the current funding system for schools. Then in July 2001 Former Headmaster Anthony Neal disagreed with School Standards Minister Stephen Timms over the benefits of specialist schools saying that they create a two-tier system. Homework was being publicly discussed in December 2001 in the wake of Cherie Blair's request to the Ministry of Defence for information to help with her son's homework. Neal commented that homework was essential and central to the fact that standards were rising.

Police apologised to the school, in November 2006, after a computer error wrongly put it at the top of a national table for the number of police call-outs.

Notable former pupils

Professor Anthony Davenport, Professor of Cardiovascular Pharmacology & Fellow of St Catherine’s College, University of Cambridge. Director of the Human Receptor Research group.
Phil Boulton, Professional Rugby Union player with Leicester Tigers, Rotherham Titans and Bedford Blues.
 Bruce Barrymore Halpenny, military historian and author
 Sir Walter Liddall CBE, Conservative MP from 1931-45 for Lincoln
 Philippa Lowthorpe, television director whose credits include the controversial Jamaica Inn, and Call the Midwife
 Michael Oglesby, High Sheriff of Greater Manchester from 2007–08
 Rod Temperton, songwriter of the Michael Jackson song Thriller
 Sir Richard Wakerley, barrister
 John Graham Wallace, illustrator
 Prof Charles Wilson CBE, Professor of Modern History from 1965-79 at the University of Cambridge
 Gordon White, Baron White of Hull, co-founder of Hanson plc
 Dr Garry Campion FRHistS, historian.

Market Rasen Secondary Modern School
 Bernie Taupin, lyricist for Elton John

References

Further reading
 Joan Harrop. A history of the development of De Aston School, Market Rasen. Middle Rasen: J Harrop, 1991.

External links

 

De Aston school history - contains details of former pupils circa 1900.
 De Aston School war memorial - contains details of former pupils who fell in the first world war.

Educational institutions established in 1863
Boarding schools in Lincolnshire
Grade II listed buildings in Lincolnshire
West Lindsey District
Secondary schools in Lincolnshire
Academies in Lincolnshire
People educated at De Aston School
1863 establishments in England